The 1999 Danish Figure Skating Championships was held in Aarhus from December 5 to 6, 1998. Skaters competed in the disciplines of men's singles and ladies' singles, and ice dance. Not all disciplines were held on all levels due to a lack of participants.

Senior results

Men

Ladies

Ice dance

External links
 results

Danish Figure Skating Championships
1998 in figure skating
Danish Figure Skating Championships, 1999
Figure Skating Championships